Zyvex Marine is a division of Zyvex Technologies, a molecular engineering company. Zyvex Marine develops boats that use Zyvex Technologies' proprietary nanomaterials.

History

Zyvex Marine was formally announced as a division of Zyvex Technologies on November 4, 2011. It is headquartered in Bothell, Washington. Zyvex Marine launched its first production boat on November 4, 2011.

In 2009, prior to becoming a formal division, Zyvex Marine created the world's first commercialized carbon nanotube enhanced (CNTe) carbon fiber prototype vessel called the 540SE. It was designed to offer a 75% reduction in fuel consumption costs based on lightweight nanomaterials used in its hull design.

In 2010, it created the first prototype vessel called the Piranha Unmanned Surface Vessel, which is a 54-foot (16.4 meter) boat made out of the same lightweight nanomaterials as the 540SE.

In 2011, Zyvex shipped its first production craft, a 54-foot lightweight boat.

Vessels

Piranha
The Piranha Unmanned Surface Vessel is a 54-foot (16.4 meter) vessel created out of lightweight nanomaterials. It was announced on February 19, 2010. The first Piranha began construction in February 2010 and was completed and initiating sea trials by October 2010. The Piranha concluded approximately 6 months and 600 nautical miles of sea trials in Washington state and Oregon state on April 4, 2011.

References

External links
Zyvex Marine

Nanotechnology companies